Azay-sur-Indre (literally Azay on Indre) is a commune in the Indre-et-Loire department in central France.

Geography
The Indrois flows west through the eastern part of the commune, then flows into the Indre.

The village lies in the middle of the commune, on the left bank of the Indre, which flows northwest through the middle of the commune.

Population

See also
Communes of the Indre-et-Loire department

References

Communes of Indre-et-Loire